The Durango Telegraph is an independent weekly publication based in Durango, Colorado. The Telegraph began publication on August 22, 2002. Founded as an alternative to the region's dominant daily newspaper, the Telegraph was named after a popular local mountain bike trail.

The Telegraph features reporting on environmental, recreational, political, arts, and entertainment news in the Four Corners region of Southwestern Colorado. It also features regular opinion pieces under the header La Vida Local and original political cartoons. The paper is distributed every Thursday to stands in and around Durango at no cost, thus spurring its marketing tagline "Free but not easy."

The Telegraph also publishes the quarterly magazine The Gulch, dedicated more to stories, long-form journalism, and photography than the weekly newspaper.

Publishers 

Missy Votel

Regular contributors 

 Lainie Maxson
 Missy Votel
 Steve Eginoire
 Shan Wells
 Chris Aaland
 Zach Hively
 David Feela
 Joy Martin
 Luke Mehall
 Jennaye Derge
 Ari Levaux
 Jeff Mannix
 Rachel

Notable past contributors include:

 Stew Mosberg
 Jen Reeder
 Tracy Chamberlin
 Clint Reid
 Allen Best
 Stacy Falk

References

External links 
 http://www.durangotelegraph.com

Weekly newspaper companies of the United States
Alternative weekly newspapers published in the United States
Newspapers established in 2002
Durango, Colorado
2002 establishments in Colorado